Merton Frederick Ellson (10 July 1890 – 1958) was an English footballer who played in the Football League for Halifax Town and Leeds United.

References

1890 births
1958 deaths
English footballers
Association football forwards
English Football League players
Frickley Athletic F.C. players
Leeds United F.C. players
Halifax Town A.F.C. players